Timothy Cummins House is a historic home located near Smyrna, Kent County, Delaware.  It built about 1780, and is a two-story, five-bay center hall plan brick dwelling in the Georgian style. It has a small -story kitchen wing. A Greek Revival-style porch was added in the second quarter of the 19th century.

It was listed on the National Register of Historic Places in 1983.

References

Houses completed in 1780
Houses on the National Register of Historic Places in Delaware
Georgian architecture in Delaware
Houses in Kent County, Delaware
National Register of Historic Places in Kent County, Delaware